The 1987 Cork Intermediate Football Championship was the 52nd staging of the Cork Intermediate Football Championship since its establishment by the Cork County Board in 1909. The draw for the opening round fixtures took place on 21 December 1986.

The final was played on 1 November 1987 at Bride Rovers Park, between Glanmire and Fermoy, in what was their first ever final meeting. Glanmire won the match by 3–05 to 0–06 to claim their first ever championship title.

Mallow's Alan Copps was the championship's top scorer with 2–13.

Results

First round

Second round

Quarter-finals

Semi-finals

Final

Championship statistics

Top scorers

Top scorers overall

Top scorers in a single game

References

Cork Intermediate Football Championship